

Golf
 Sewsunker "Papwa" Sewgolum won the Dutch Open golf tournament for the second year in a row.

See also
 1960 in South Africa
 Timeline of South African sport

 
South Africa